Jean Roux-Delimal (20 May 1907 – 25 March 2005) was a French sailor. He competed in the 5.5 Metre event at the 1952 Summer Olympics.

References

External links
 

1907 births
2005 deaths
French male sailors (sport)
Olympic sailors of France
Sailors at the 1952 Summer Olympics – 5.5 Metre
Sportspeople from Tours, France